"Breaking It Slowly" is a song by Australian alternative rock group George. It was released as the fourth and final single from their debut studio album Polyserena (2002).

Track listing
CD single (021082)
 "Breaking It Slowly" – 4:05
 "Breathe in Now" (Mellow Kt & Piano Solo) – 4:07
 "Real" (acoustic) – 4:37
 "Polyserena" (live at the Eclectic Festival, Kings Park, Perth) – 7:30
 "Release" (live at the Wireless) – 3:42

Charts

References

George (band) songs
2001 songs
2002 singles